Dainis Kazakevičs (born 30 March 1981) is a Latvian professional football manager who currently is the manager of the Latvia national team.

Club career
Kazakevičs began his career in the youth team of Jelgavas BJSS, later representing Jelgava-based club Dialogs in the 1995 edition of the Latvian First League.

Managerial career
Following his playing career, Kazakevičs moved into coaching, coaching Viola's second team. In 2001, Kazakevičs was appointed head coach of Viola. Kazakevičs held the post until the club's demise in 2003, when they merged with RAF Jelgava to form FK Jelgava. Kazakevičs remained manager of the newly formed club. In 2009, Kazakevičs won the Latvian First League, guiding the club to the Latvian Football Cup a year later. In 2013, following his departure from Jelgava, Kazakevičs was appointed Latvia's under-21 manager. Kazakevičs remained in the post for seven years. On 20 January 2020, Kazakevičs was confirmed as Slaviša Stojanovič's successor as manager of Latvia.

Managerial statistics

References

People from Bauska
1981 births
Living people
Latvian footballers
FK Jelgava managers
Latvia national football team managers
Latvian football managers
Association footballers not categorized by position